Bodotria is a genus of crustaceans which belong to the family Bodotriidae. It includes the following species:

Bodotria africana Zimmer, 1908
Bodotria alata Bacescu & Muradian, 1975
Bodotria andamanensis Petrescu & Chatterjee, 2011
Bodotria angusta Harada, 1967
Bodotria arenosa Goodsir, 1843
Bodotria arianii Petrescu, 2003
Bodotria armata Tafe & Greenwood, 1996
Bodotria armoricana Le Loeuff & Intes, 1977
Bodotria australis Stebbing, 1912
Bodotria bineti Le Loeuff & Intes, 1977
Bodotria biocellata Radhadevi & Kurian, 1989
Bodotria biplicata Gamo, 1964
Bodotria carinata Gamo, 1964
Bodotria choprai Kurian, 1951
Bodotria clara Day, 1978
Bodotria corallina Muhlenhardt-Siegel, 2000
Bodotria cribraria Le Loeuff & Intes, 1972
Bodotria depressa Harada, 1967
Bodotria dispar Harada, 1967
Bodotria elevata Jones, 1960
Bodotria falsinus Day, 1978
Bodotria furugelmiensis Tzareva & Vassilenko, 2006
Bodotria gibba (Sars, 1878)
Bodotria glabra Jones, 1955
Bodotria intermedia Le Loeuff & Intes, 1977
Bodotria iroensis Harada, 1967
Bodotria laevigata Le Loeuff & Intes, 1977
Bodotria lata Jones, 1956
Bodotria maculosa Hale, 1944
Bodotria magna Zimmer, 1921
Bodotria minuta Kurian, 1961
Bodotria montagui Stebbing, 1912
Bodotria nitida Day, 1978
Bodotria nuda Harada, 1967
Bodotria ovalis Gamo, 1965
Bodotria ozolinshi Tsareva & Vassilenko, 1993
Bodotria parva Calman, 1907
Bodotria parvui Petrescu, 2008
Bodotria platybasis Radhadevi & Kurian, 1981
Bodotria prionura Zimmer, 1952
Bodotria pulchella (Sars, 1878)
Bodotria pulex (Zimmer, 1903)
Bodotria rugosa Gamo, 1963
Bodotria scorpioides (Montagu, 1804)
Bodotria serica Day, 1978
Bodotria serrata Harada, 1967
Bodotria serrulata Gamo, 1965
Bodotria setoensis Harada, 1967
Bodotria similis Calman, 1907
Bodotria spinifera Gamo, 1986
Bodotria sublevis Calman, 1907
Bodotria tenuis Day, 1978
Bodotria tosaensis Harada, 1967
Bodotria unacarina Muhlenhardt-Siegel, 2003

References

Cumacea